The Ministry of Justice oversees the administration and management of the justice system in Guinea.

List of ministers 
A list of Ministers of Justice of Guinea follows, from independence to the present.

See also

 Justice ministry
 Politics of Guinea

References

Justice ministries
Government of Guinea
Politics of Guinea